Alin Ilie Dudea (born 6 June 1997) is a Romanian professional footballer who plays as a defender for Liga III club CSM Reșița..

Career statistics

Club

Honours
Dinamo București
Cupa Ligii: 2016–17

Chindia Târgoviște
Liga II: 2018–19

CSM Reșița
Liga III: 2021–22

References

External links
 
 

1997 births
Living people
Sportspeople from Craiova
Romanian footballers
Romania youth international footballers
Romania under-21 international footballers
Association football defenders
Liga I players
FC Dinamo București players
Liga II players
Liga III players
ACS Foresta Suceava players
AFC Chindia Târgoviște players
CSM Reșița players